Emel Etem Toshkova (born 4 March 1958) is a Bulgarian politician of Turkish descent with the Movement for Rights and Freedoms (MRF), the main Turkish party in Bulgaria. She is the ex-Deputy Prime Minister of Bulgaria and the ex-Minister of the no longer existing National Disasters and Emergencies. Her constituency is Razgrad.

Biography 
Emel Toshkova was born on 4 March 1958 in the town of Isperih. In 1981, she graduated from "Angel Kunchev" Higher Technical School in Ruse and earned a master's degree in Mechanical Engineering. From 1981 to 1992 she worked at the Naiden Kirov plant also in Ruse as a Construction Engineer.

Between 17 August 2005 and July 2009, Emel Toshkova was Deputy Prime Minister and Minister of Emergencies.

Political career 
Emel Etem was criticized in Bulgaria for being incompetent as Minister of Natural Disasters and Emergencies. She is sometimes called "Mrs. Disaster" by her critics for her supposed inadequate behavior (failing to provide basic relief) during the floods at Tsar Kaloyan, a town which has a significant Turkish population and also for the ill preparation for the snowfall in February 2008 in Bulgaria.

Miscellaneous facts 
 Her name, Emel, means "desire" or "desirable" in Turkish.
 She is fluent in Bulgarian, Turkish, English and Russian.
 She is married and has a son.
 A star in the Cassiopeia constellation is named after her.

See also 
 Turks in Bulgaria
 Politics of Bulgaria

References

External links 
 Emel Etem Toshkova, database of the National assembly of the Republic of Bulgaria

1958 births
Living people
Bulgarian people of Turkish descent
People from Isperih
Deputy prime ministers of Bulgaria
Government ministers of Bulgaria
Women government ministers of Bulgaria
21st-century Bulgarian women politicians
21st-century Bulgarian politicians